"What Went Down" is a single by the British rock band Foals. It is the title track from their fourth studio album of the same name and was debuted and released as its lead single on 16 June 2015 via DJ Annie Mac's BBC Radio 1 show.

Track listing

Charts

Certifications

Bandwidth remix 

On 16 September 2015, a remix of "What Went Down" was released featuring remixing from Justin Chancellor (Tool) and Scott Kirkland of The Crystal Method. The single was released for streaming and digital download.

References

External links 
 

2015 singles
2015 songs
Foals songs
Transgressive Records singles
Warner Records singles
Songs written by Yannis Philippakis